William Watkins Davidson (20 March 1920 – 26 May 2015) was an English cricketer.

Bill Davidson was born at Poplar, London, and was educated at Brighton College before going up to Wadham College, Oxford, to study theology. In the Second World War he served in the Army in Burma and Malaya.

A wicket-keeper and tail-end right-handed batsman, Davidson made his first-class debut for Oxford University Cricket Club against Gloucestershire in 1947.  He made fifteen further first-class appearances for the university, the last of which came against Cambridge University at The University Match at Lord's in 1948.  In his sixteen first-class appearances for the university, Davidson scored 65 runs at an average of 6.50, with a high score of 18 not out.  Behind the stumps he took 22 catches and made 5 stumpings.

In 1948 Davidson made his first-class debut for Sussex against Essex in the County Championship.  He made four further first-class appearances for the county, the last of which came against Gloucestershire in the 1951 County Championship.  In his five first-class matches for Sussex, he scored 21 runs at an average of 4.20, with a high score of 7.  Behind the stumps, he took 12 catches and made a single stumping.  He later made a first-class appearance for the Marylebone Cricket Club against Oxford University in 1956, making his highest first-class score of 31 in the MCC's first innings.

After retiring from cricket he was ordained. He became a naval chaplain and was later a vicar in parishes in Surrey and Westminster.  He died on 26 May 2015.

References

External links
William Davidson at ESPNcricinfo
William Davidson at CricketArchive

1920 births
2015 deaths
People from Poplar, London
People educated at Brighton College
Alumni of Wadham College, Oxford
British Army personnel of World War II
English cricketers
Oxford University cricketers
Sussex cricketers
Marylebone Cricket Club cricketers
Royal Navy chaplains
Royal Navy cricketers
Wicket-keepers